Ectomorphed Works is a remix album released by L'Arc-en-Ciel on June 28, 2000. All mixes were created by the band's drummer, Yukihiro.

Track listing

Personnel
 Hyde – vocals
 Ken – guitar
 Tetsu – bass guitar, backing vocals
 Yukihiro – drums

L'Arc-en-Ciel albums
2000 remix albums